Along West is one of the 60 assembly constituencies of  Arunachal Pradesh a north east state of India. It is part of Arunachal West Lok Sabha constituency.

Members of Legislative Assembly
 1990: Kirge Eshi, Janata Dal
 1995: Kento Ete, Indian National Congress
 1999: Kento Ete, Indian National Congress
 2004: Gadam Ete, Indian National Congress
 2009: Gadam Ete, Indian National Congress
 2014: Tumke Bagra, Bharatiya Janata Party

Election results

2019

See also

 Along West
 West Siang district
 List of constituencies of Arunachal Pradesh Legislative Assembly

References

Assembly constituencies of Arunachal Pradesh
West Siang district